It Can't Be! (stylized as NPS: ¡No puede ser!) is a Venezuelan teen comedy television series produced by Boomerang Latin America and Venevisión. It's a spin-off of Somos tú y yo. It's aimed at teen and youth audiences. It premiered on July 22, 2011.

Sheryl Rubio, Hendrick Bages, Natalia Moretti, Corina Smith and Samantha Méndez are the leads. Rosangélica Piscitelli and Rosmeri Marval are the antagonists.

Synopsis 
NPS: No puede ser is a spin-off that takes place a year and a half after Somos tú y yo. In ¡No Puede Ser! the two most beloved characters – and die-hard rivals – from the original series, Sheryl Sanchez and Rosmery Rivas, are thrown together in hilarious situations when they sign up to participate in a televised reality show, competing to win a huge recording contract... while fighting for the attention of the handsome Hendrick, an old schoolmate who is now one of the counselors at the summer camp where all the contestants must live together during the competition.

Production

Pre-production and background 
In August 2009, Boomerang announced that Vladimir Perez, Elizabeth Carmona, Patricio Gamonal and Olivier Lelardoux, the creators of Somos tú y yo and La Tortuga Taruga from Atiempo in Chile, would be making a spin-off of Somos tu y yo an unprecedented worldwide success have now crossed over into a different genre, the sitcom, to bring their fans fresh adventures full of comedy and music called NPS: No puede ser, and ordered the pilot episode.

The series was broadcast for the first time in Venezuela on July 25, 2011 by Venevisión, with an audience of 4.3 million viewers. In Latin America the series premiered on November 8, 2010, while its premiere in Italy and Spain was the September 26, 2011 by Frisbee.

Cast
 Sheryl Rubio as Sheryl Sánchez 
 Hendrick Bages as Hendrick Welles 
 Rosmeri Marval as Rosmery Rivas
 Samantha Méndez as Laura McDonovan 
 Rosangélica Piscitelli as Rosangela Rojas 
 Natalia Moretti as Abril Pérez
 Corina Smith as Tina Martínez 
 Joshua García as Joshua Welles
 Alejandro Soteldo as Enrique Hitchcock
 Alfredo Lovera as Carmelo Guzmán
 Francisco Ruíz as Óscar
 Omar Sabino as Nelson
 Diego Salazar as Marcos Guzmán
 Aileen Celeste as Tatiana Jiurcovich
 Catherina Cardozo as Beatríz Rocas

Guest stars
 Myriam Abreu
 Victor Drija
 Gustavo Elis
 Sixto Rein

Episodes

 Music 
The first soundtrack of the series, titled No puede ser'', was released on July 22, 2011.

Track listing

References

Boomerang (TV network) original programming
Venevisión telenovelas
Venezuelan telenovelas
Musical television series
Spanish-language telenovelas
2011 Venezuelan television series debuts
2011 Venezuelan television series endings
2010s Venezuelan television series
2011 telenovelas
Television shows set in Caracas
Television series about teenagers